Gold Rush (formerly Gold Rush Alaska) is a reality television series that airs on Discovery Channel, with reruns also airing on TLC. The show's ninth season began airing on October 12, 2018.  As of May 4, 2018, a total of 176 episodes of Gold Rush have been aired, including 16 specials and two mini-series.

Series overview

Episodes

Season 1 (2010–11) 

During season 1, the series was named Gold Rush: Alaska, and the mining occurred at Porcupine Creek, on the Alaskan panhandle.

Season 2 (2011–12) 

For season 2, the series was retitled Gold Rush. The show followed groups of miners at locations in both the panhandle of Alaska, USA, and in the Klondike of the Yukon, Canada.

The Jungle Special (2012)

Season 3 (2012–13)

South America (2013)

Season 4 (2013–14)

Season 5 (2014–15)

Season 6 (2015–16)

Season 7 (2016–17)

Mini-Series: Parker's Trail (2017) 

Between 1896 and 1899, more than 100,000 brave souls set out on a perilous journey into the frozen North on the legendary Klondike Gold Rush trail. Most never made it to the end. Killed or scared off by bears, treacherous terrain, raging torrents and temperatures below -40 degrees, only one in three completed the journey. Now Parker Schnabel of Discovery GOLD RUSH fame, will attempt to make this same journey and document it in Gold Rush: Parker's Trail.

Season 8 (2017–18)

Parker's Trail "Guyana" (2018)

Season 9 (2018–19)

Parker's Trail "Papua New Guinea" (2019)

Season 10 (2019–20)

Parker's Trail "Australia" (2020)

Season 11 (2020–21)

Winter's Fortune (2021)

Season 12 (2021-2022)

Season 12: The Hoffman Story
Gold Rush: The Dirt: The Hoffman Story; companion documentary show for Gold Rush about the Hoffmans mining endeavor, 316 Mining.

Season 12: The Dirt
Gold Rush: The Dirt; companion show for Gold Rush serves as a behind the scenes look.

Parker's Trail "New Zealand" (2022)

Season 13 (2022-2023)

References 

 
 

Gold Rush